Amazing God is the twenty-fifth album released by Christian singer Marcos Witt. The album was recorded live from Houston, Texas. This was Witt's first English language album recorded.

Track listing
"All Out" - 03:53
"You Reign" - 04:37
"Amazing God" - 07:54
"Please And Thank You" - 01:48
"Bigger Than My Imagination" (Featuring Michael Gungor) - 06:01
"Lord I Seek You" (Featuring Cindy Cruse-Ratcliff) - 03:53
"I Will Sing Of Your Love" (Featuring Cindy Cruse-Ratcliff) - 05:55
"Thank You" - 03:21
"Aleluya To Our God" - 06:25
"Our God Is Lord Of All" (Bonus Track) - 03:34
"Lord I Seek You" (Bonus Track) - 03:55
"I Will Sing, I Will Dance" (Bonus Track) - 04:38
"Jesús Es El Señor" (Bonus Track) - 03:33

Credits
Producers:
 Juan Salinas
 Coalo Zamorano

Executive Producer:
 Marcos Witt

Arrangers:
 Emmanuel Espinosa
 Holger Fath
 Coalo Zamorano

Worship Leader: 
 Marcos Witt

Musicians:
 Randall Gonzalez - drums
 Coalo Zamorano - drums, acoustic guitar, synthesizer programming
 Holger Fath - drums, electric guitar, synthesizer programming
 Emmanuel Espinosa - bass, drums, synthesizer programming
 Allan Villatoro - keyboards, piano
 The Nashville string machine - strings
 
Background Vocals:
 Karen Adams
 Dakri Brown
 Michael Gungor
 Cindy Cruse-Ratcliff
 Coalo Zamorano
 Lorena Zamorano

Engineer:
 Orlando Rodriguez - engineer, mixing
 Héctor Sotelo - cover design
 Juan Salinas - translation
 Coalo Zamorano - translation

References

2003 live albums

Marcos Witt live albums